Cowboy in the Clouds is a 1943 American Western film directed by Benjamin H. Kline and written by Elizabeth Beecher. The film stars Charles Starrett, Dub Taylor, Julie Duncan, Jimmy Wakely, Davison Clark and Wally Wales. The film was released on December 23, 1943, by Columbia Pictures.

Plot

Cast           
Charles Starrett as Steve Kendall
Dub Taylor as Cannonball
Julie Duncan as Dorrie Bishop
Jimmy Wakely as Glen Avery
Davison Clark as Amos Fowler
Wally Wales as Haldey
Dick Curtis as Roy Madison
Ed Cassidy as Sheriff Page 
Paul Conrad as Dean 
Charles King as Thripp 
John Tyrrell as Mack Judd
Foy Willing as Foy
Shelby Atchinson as Shelby
Dwight Latham as Dwight
Guy Bonham as Guy
Walter Carlson as Walter

References

External links
 

1943 films
1940s English-language films
American Western (genre) films
1943 Western (genre) films
Columbia Pictures films
American black-and-white films
1940s American films